Mrs. Mills Solves all Your Problems is a popular, satirical and fictional agony aunt column in The Sunday Times Style magazine, in which readers write or email Mrs Mills and she replies with exceptionally bad advice. Examples include -"get a new best friend"- or "she is obviously sleeping with your husband". She is currently depicted as an attractive, stylish, glamorous, brunette (later raven-haired), forty-something year old woman but was previously drawn as an older, more prudish woman. She receives many pleas for advice each week.

Further publications 
A book has been released by the Sunday Times of her most notable responses, and is available from their website.

References 
Style Magazine, Sunday Times website

The Sunday Times (UK)
Advice columns
Works published under a pseudonym